Evelyn Künneke (15 December 1921 – 28 April 2001) was a German singer and stage, television and film actress. She was the daughter of the famous composer Eduard Künneke.

Selected filmography

 Goodbye, Franziska (1941)
 Third from the Right (1950)
 Maya of the Seven Veils (1951)
 Dancing Stars (1952)
 The Big Star Parade (1954)
 I Was an Ugly Girl (1955)
 My Wife Makes Music (1958)
 I'd Like to Have My Troubles (1975)
 Flaming Hearts (1978)
 Just a Gigolo (1978)
 The Hamburg Syndrome (1979)
 Killer Condom (1996)

References

Bibliography

External links

1921 births
2001 deaths
Actresses from Berlin
German film actresses
German stage actresses
German television actresses
20th-century German women singers